Frederick Cornwallis (5 March 1713 – 19 March 1783) served as Archbishop of Canterbury, after an illustrious career in the Anglican Church. He was born the seventh son of an aristocratic family.

His twin brother Edward Cornwallis had a military career, becoming a general in the British Army, who twice served as a military governor of colonies. He founded Halifax, Nova Scotia in 1749.

Early life and education
Cornwallis was born in London, England, the seventh son of Charles Cornwallis, 4th Baron Cornwallis. His twin brother Edward Cornwallis was born sixth. He was educated at Eton College and graduated from Christ's College, Cambridge. He was ordained a priest in 1742, and became a Doctor of Divinity in 1748.

Career
Cornwallis was able to ascend quickly in the Church thanks to his aristocratic connections. In 1746 he was made chaplain to King George II and a canon of Windsor. In 1750 he became a canon at St Paul's Cathedral, and later that same year became Bishop of Lichfield and Coventry, thanks to the patronage of the Duke of Newcastle, then Secretary of State. He was also Dean of Windsor (1765–1768) and Dean of St Paul's (1766–1768).

On the death of Thomas Secker in 1768, Cornwallis's friendship with the prime minister, the Duke of Grafton, resulted in his translation to Archbishop of Canterbury. As archbishop, his sociability and geniality made him popular. He was a consistent supporter of the administration of Lord North, and led efforts in support of Anglican clergy who were dispossessed of their livings in the American colonies during the American Revolution. He was buried at St. Mary's Church, Lambeth.

On the whole, Cornwallis has generally been judged as a competent administrator, but an uninspiring leader of the eighteenth-century church. He is considered a typical product of eighteenth-century latitudinarianism, and their lack of zeal paved the way for the differing responses of both the Evangelicals and the Oxford Movement in the early 19th century.

Personal life
His nephew was Charles Cornwallis, 1st Marquess Cornwallis, a British general during the American Revolution, who surrendered his forces at Yorktown, Virginia. Later he was appointed as Governor-General of India.

Discovery of likely coffin

In 2016, during the refurbishment of the Garden Museum, which is housed at the medieval church of St Mary-at-Lambeth, 30 lead coffins were found under the church floor. One had an archbishop's red and gold mitre on top of it. Two archbishops were identified from nameplates on their coffins. Church records document that three additional archbishops, including Cornwallis, are likely to be buried in the vault.

References

Further reading 
The Neglected Archbishop of Cantebury

1713 births
1783 deaths
People educated at Eton College
Alumni of Christ's College, Cambridge
Bishops of Lichfield
Archbishops of Canterbury
Deans of St Paul's
18th-century Anglican archbishops
Younger sons of barons
Canons of Windsor
Deans of Windsor
Frederick
Burials at St Mary-at-Lambeth
English twins
18th-century Church of England bishops